Yar Hoseynabad (also Romanized as Yār Ḩoseynābād; also known as Yār Ḩasanābād) is a village in Mirbag-e Shomali Rural District, in the Central District of Delfan County, Lorestan Province, Iran. At the 2006 census, its population was 137, in 32 families.

References 

Towns and villages in Delfan County